Giacomo Crosa (born 11 January 1947) is an Italian journalist and a former high jumper.

Biography
He finished sixth at the 1968 Olympic Games, this is the best performance for an Italian high jumper at the Summer Olympics like Rodolfo Bergamo at 1976 Summer Olympics. His personal best jump is 2.14 metres, achieved in the 1968 Olympic qualifying round.

Became a commentator and sports journalist, in 2009 he received the appointment as Deputy Director R.T.I. - Mediaset, position held until 31 December 2012. He has conducted various editions and sports columns of TG5, Italia 1 and Rete 4, always present in all the initiatives in the information field of the Fininvest group.

Olympic results

See also
 Men's high jump Italian record progression

References

External links
 

1947 births
Living people
Italian male journalists
Italian sports journalists
Italian male high jumpers
Athletes (track and field) at the 1968 Summer Olympics
Olympic athletes of Italy
Athletics competitors of Centro Sportivo Aeronautica Militare
Sportspeople from the Province of Alessandria
20th-century Italian people
21st-century Italian people